Zappey's flycatcher (Cyanoptila cumatilis) is a songbird in the Old World flycatcher family Muscicapidae. It breeds in central China and winters to the Malay Peninsula, Sumatra and Java. It was formerly considered to be conspecific with the blue-and-white flycatcher.

References

Zappey's flycatcher
Birds of Central China
Zappey's flycatcher
Zappey's flycatcher